Michael Onajirevbe Ibru (25 December 1930 – 6 September 2016) was a Nigerian businessman from Agbara-Otor, Delta State. He was the head of the Ibru Organization, one of the largest conglomerates in Nigeria. As a traditional chieftain of his homeland, Ibru bore the tribal honorific Olorogun and often used it as a pre-nominal style. This title is also borne by many of the members of his large family in the same way.

Early life
Ibru was born to the family of Janet Ibru and Peter Ibru, a missionary worker, who also worked at the Igbobi Orthapaedic Hospital, Lagos. After secondary school, he joined the United African Company, as a management trainee. In 1956, a few years after joining U.A.C, he dropped out of the company and started a partnership, which he called Laibru. The corporate entity was in partnership with an expatriate, Jimmy Large. After engaging in general trading with some success, in 1957, Michael Ibru discovered that the frozen fish market was a fertile market with the potential to deliver returns above the market rate. However, it was a tough market to penetrate, at the time, many expatriate firms and Nigerian traders were lacking and some were not interested in the market. But he felt he could put extra effort communicating with general traders, who played key roles in products acceptance. To trade in seafood, he established an importing company, he also rented and built cold storage facilities across the country. By the mid-1960s trading fish had become the traditional money maker for the Ibru organization. Though he had other profitable interests such as transportation and construction, fish trading helped him secure financing and other forms of capital to engage in large scale trading. He established a partnership with a Taiwanese company, Osadjere Fishing Company, which provided Trawlers and other accessories for trading. By the end of the 1960s he branched out fully into other areas of the economy. Like a lot of his contemporaries, he established a transportation company, called Rutam. He also invested in palm oil production. Over the years, the Ibru Organization has expanded into other areas such as Tourism, Brewery, Timber and Poultry.

He was known as an entrepreneurial figure who created one of the largest modern Nigerian owned groups with other figures such as the low key Bode Akindele.

Education
Michael Ibru attended Igbobi College, and acquired a school certificate in 1951.

Urhobo nation
No group of Nigerians has benefited more from Michael Ibru's legacy than the Urhobo people. Urhobo men and women have profited at many levels since the rise of the Ibru brand in the second half of the 1950s. First, Urhobo market women were among the first batch of Nigerians to embrace the "Ibru" frozen fish. Many of them rose from relative poverty to higher economic brackets because they participated in the new Ibru ventures from market stalls. There were more direct beneficiaries from Michael Ibru's openness to his Urhobo people. These were the many Urhobo professionals who joined the Ibru organization. Many of them left the Ibru organization to pursue their own independent dreams constructed with the aid of ambitions conceived in the Ibru organization. A full list of Urhobo professionals who worked and prospered in the Ibru organization will fill many pages.

The Urhobo have a more particular reason for admiring Michael Ibru. Well up to the 1950s, the image of the Urhobo was not among the best in the Nigerian nation. With the accomplishments and competence of Michael Ibru especially, as well as the achievements of other giants of Nigerian commerce and economics as David Dafinone and Gamaliel Onosode, the Urhobo image has been strengthened in major ways. For that, the Urhobo have embraced Michael Ibru as an historic figure. There is more in the love bonds between the Urhobo people and Michael Ibru. Michael Ibru has embraced Urhobo culture and Urhobo cultural organizations, especially Urhobo Progress Union, in a manner that pleases the Urhobo people. It is Michael Ibru who popularized the use of the title "Olorogun" in place of "Chief."

Private citizen
Chief Ibru has five wives, and seventeen children, the most prominent being Olorogun Oskar Ibru (who heads Ibafon Ports) and Oboden Ibru (who was a key player in Oceanic bank International PLC).
He also tried his hands in politics, in 1983, he was a gubernatorial candidate but lost to Samuel Ogbemudia. He is also a member of the Liberal Convention and the New Movement, which metamorphosed to become NRC.

Death
Ibru, who was the patriarch of one of Nigeria's foremost business dynasties, died at a medical facility in the United States in the early hours of Tuesday, September 6, 2016. Ibru was survived by his brother, Goodie Ibru; his wife, Cecilia Ibru; and several children, including Oskar Ibru and Oboden Ibru; and grandchildren.

References

Tom Forrest, The Advance of African Capital:The Growth of Nigerian Private Enterprise. University of Virginia Press (August 1994). 

1930 births
2016 deaths
Businesspeople from Lagos
Igbobi College alumni
20th-century Nigerian businesspeople
Michael